Lisa Stansfield is the fourth album by British singer Lisa Stansfield, released by Arista Records on 21 March 1997. It was her first new studio album since 1993's So Natural. Stansfield co-wrote most songs for the album with her husband Ian Devaney. The tracks were produced by Devaney and Peter Mokran. Lisa Stansfield garnered favourable reviews from music critics and was commercially successful, reaching number two in the United Kingdom and receiving Gold certification. In the United States, it spawned four number-one singles on Billboards Hot Dance Club Songs. Lisa Stansfield was rereleased as a deluxe 2CD + DVD set in Europe in November 2014.

Background
Lisa Stansfield released her eponymous album in March 1997, almost four years after her previous studio album, So Natural. It does not feature contribution from Andy Morris, who worked on Stansfield's previous releases. Between So Natural and Lisa Stansfield, she recorded and released two singles from the 1994 soundtracks: "Make It Right" from Beverly Hills 90210: The College Years and "Dream Away" (duet with Babyface) from The Pagemaster.

Content
Lisa Stansfield was produced by Ian Devaney and Peter Mokran. It includes sixteen songs, mainly written by Stansfield and Devaney. Four songs were co-written by Richard Darbyshire, (frontman of the British band Living in a Box). "I Cried My Last Tear Last Night" was written by Diane Warren. The album also contains two covers: Barry White's "Never, Never Gonna Give You Up" and Phyllis Hyman's "You Know How to Love Me." In Europe and North America, Lisa Stansfield was released with bonus remixes of "The Real Thing" and "People Hold On". In Japan, bonus tracks included "People Hold On" (Bootleg Mix) and a cover of Player's song, "Baby Come Back". In 2003, the album was remastered and re-released with three bonus songs: "People Hold On" (Bootleg Mix), "Baby Come Back" and "Breathtaking", B-side of the withdrawn single "Don't Cry for Me".

Lisa Stansfield was remastered and expanded, and was re-released as a deluxe 2CD + DVD set in November 2014. This edition was expanded to feature rare tracks and 12" mixes plus videos, live footage and a specially recorded interview with Stansfield. The twenty-eight-page booklet features photos, memorabilia, lyrics and brand new sleeve notes. The set was issued in the United Kingdom on 10 November 2014 and in Europe on 21 November 2014. It was also released as a part of The Collection 1989–2003 at the same time. The 2014 reissue of Lisa Stansfield includes previously unreleased track, "The Real Thing" (Silk's Real House Thang). Additionally, People Hold On ... The Remix Anthology features the following previously unreleased remixes of songs from Lisa Stansfield: "Never Gonna Fall" (Wyclef Remix) and three remixes of "Never, Never Gonna Give You Up" (Frankie's Classic Club Mix, Franktified Off the Hook Dub and After Hours Mix).

Singles
In January 1997, Arista Records released "People Hold On" (The Bootleg Mixes) as a single. The song, originally recorded by Coldcut and Stansfield in 1989, was remixed by the Dirty Rotten Scoundrels. The remix version reached number one on the Billboards Hot Dance Club Songs, number four on the UK Singles Chart and number fifteen on the Irish Singles Chart. After this success, "People Hold On" (Bootleg Mix) was included on Lisa Stansfield as a bonus track. The first proper single form the album, "The Real Thing" was released in Europe, Australia and Japan in March 1997. The song peaked at number nine in the United Kingdom. "Never, Never Gonna Give You Up" was chosen as the next single in Europe, Australia and Japan, and first proper single in North America. It was released in June 1997. The song reached number twenty-five in the United Kingdom, number seventy-four on the Billboard Hot 100 and number one on the Hot Dance Club Songs chart. In September 1997, "The Line" was issued as a single in Europe and peaked at number sixty-four in the United Kingdom. "Never Gonna Fall" (remixed by Junior Vasquez and Victor Calderone) was chosen as next promotional single in the United States and released in October 1997, also reaching number one on the Hot Dance Club Songs (for two weeks). The single "Don't Cry for Me," set for release in Europe in November 1997, was withdrawn at the last minute. After the success on the dance charts in the United States, Arista Records issued one more promotional single, "I'm Leavin'" (remixed by Hex Hector) which also topped the Hot Dance Club Songs, becoming the fourth song from Lisa Stansfield to do so. Because of that, The Remix Album was released in June 1998.

Critical reception

Lisa Stansfield received positive reviews from music critics. According to Stephen Thomas Erlewine from AllMusic, the album "finds Stansfield at the top of her game, turning in a stylish set of smooth, disco-inflected dance-pop. The songs, from a cover of Barry White's 'Never, Never Gonna Give You Up' and 'Never Gonna Fall' to the ballad 'I Cried My Last Tear Last Night,' are uniformly strong and the singer's voice is seductive and sexy, making the album a small gem in her catalog." Josef Woodard from Entertainment Weekly wrote that Stansfield "plays her old-school R&B straight, unleashing white-soul-queen riffs over disco grooves or pop-soul ballads spiced with horns, strings, and backup vocals. She does right by Phyllis Hyman's hit 'You Know How to Love Me' with one foot in the happy-face '70s." Q stated that "Stansfield's excellent singing remains on a par with the best American female R&B and the songs are consistently superior." According to Natasha Stovall from Rolling Stone, "unlike many of her peers from England, Stansfield is not jumping on the latest UK dance trend. On her new album, the bass thumps quaintly along, and the drums are as mellow as tea and biscuits. The heat comes from Stansfield, who belts her heart out in a voice that's smooth and pliant when she's falling in love again ('The Real Thing') but edgy – even harsh – when she's staring, eyes appropriately red-rimmed, at a broken affair ('I'm Leavin''). Stovall added that Stansfield will always fit more smoothly in a smoky piano bar than in the strobe-lit warehouse of a moody DJ star."

Commercial performance
Lisa Stansfield performed well on the charts peaking at number two in the United Kingdom and being certified Gold. It also reached top ten in Belgium and Italy, peaking at number six in Belgium Flanders, number seven in Belgium Wallonia and number eight in Italy. It also peaked at number eight on the European Top 100 Albums. Lisa Stansfield was certified Gold in Switzerland and Spain, where it reached numbers 11 and 23 respectively. The album also peaked inside top forty in other European countries, including number 12 in Austria and Greece, number 13 in France and Germany, number 14 in Sweden, number 18 in the Netherlands, number 34 in Hungary and 38 in Finland. In other parts of the world, Lisa Stansfield reached number 40 in Japan and was certified Gold. It also reached number 41 in Australia, number 46 in New Zealand and 99 in Canada. In the United States, it peaked at number 55 on the Billboard 200 and number 30 on the Top R&B/Hip-Hop Albums.

Track listing

Credits and personnel
Credits taken from AllMusic.

Gareth Ashton – assistant engineer
Jon Bailey – assistant engineer
Dan Bewick – remixer, producer
Vivien Birdsall – strings
Mark Burdett – art direction
Martin Clark – strings
Luis Conte – percussion
Gary J. Crockett – bass
Richard Darbyshire – arranger
Snake Davis – saxophone, flute, horn arrangements
Ian Devaney – producer, arranger, keyboards, guitar, programming, mix, horn arrangements, string arrangements
Clare Dixon – strings
Kate Evans – strings
Matt Frost – remixer, producer
Stephanie Glyden – assistant engineer
Ricky Graham – assistant engineer
Gary Grant – trumpet, flugelhorn
Andy Grassi – assistant engineer
Bernie Grundman – mastering
Drusilla Harris – strings
Jerry Hey – trumpet, flugelhorn, horn arrangements
Dan Higgins – flute, saxophone
Julia Hoyle – strings
Rita Karidis – design
Neil Kirk – photography
Conal Markey – assistant engineer
Aidan McGovern – engineer
Aileen McLaughlin – background vocals
Doug Michael – assistant engineer
Peter Mokran – producer, arranger, keyboards, guitar, programming, mix
Des Moore – guitar
Mark Morales – producer
Jan Nossek – strings
Michael O'Donovan – assistant engineer
Sean O'Dwyer – assistant engineer
Louise Peacock – strings
Christopher Marc Potter – assistant engineer
Melvin "Wah-Wah Watson" Ragin – guitar
Bill Reichenbach Jr. – trombone
Cory Rooney – producer
Anna Ross – background vocals
Richard Simpson – assistant engineer
Snowboy – percussion
Lisa Stansfield – vocals, background vocals, arranger
Neil Stubenhaus – bass
Richard Thirlwell – strings
John Thirkell – trumpet, horn arrangements
Simon Vance – strings
Min Yang – strings

Charts

Weekly charts

Year-end charts

Certifications and sales

Release history

References

Lisa Stansfield albums
1997 albums
Albums produced by Cory Rooney